General Choe Pu-il (born 6 March 1944) is a North Korean politician who served as head of North Korea's Ministry of People's Security.

Biography
In April 1992, he was promoted to Major General and to General in October 1995. After serving as Deputy Chief of the General Staff in the Korean People's Army, he served as First Deputy Chief of Staff and Chief of Operations of the General Staff. He became a member of the Central Military Commission of the Party at the 3rd Conference of the Workers' Party of Korea held in September 2010. In the same month, along with Kim Jong-un, Kim Kyong-hui, Choe Ryong-hae, and Hyon Yong-chol, he received the military rank of General of the Army. He served as a commander at the April 2012 servicing ceremony, where Kim Jong-un gave his first speech.

He was appointed to the Minister of People's Security in February 2013 by Kim Jong-un and was elected as a candidate for the Central Committee full meeting on March 31, 2013. He was elected as a member of the National Defense Commission.

He was elected delegate in the election to the 13th Supreme People's Assembly. On May 17, it was reported that he had visited a site of a collapsed high-rise apartment in the Pyongyang area of Pyongyang City and apologized to the bereaved family members and residents along with senior government officials. In December of the same year, it was confirmed that Choi had been demoted to Major General. In October 2015, it was confirmed that Choi was again promoted to a General rank.

In July 2016, he was placed under sanctions by the United States government.

In February 2020 he was replaced by Kim Jong-ho.

On August 20, 2020, it was reported that he is now in charge of handling military affairs for the Central Committee of the Workers' Party of Korea.

Awards and honors 
The official portrait of Choe shows Choe wearing all decorations awarded to him.

 Order of Kim Il-sung

 Order of Kim Jong-il

 Order of the National Flag First Class, six times

 Order of Freedom and Independence First Class

 Order of Korean Labour

 Commemorative Order "20th Anniversary of the Foundation of the Democratic People's Republic of Korea"

 Commemorative Order "Foundation of the Democratic People's Republic of Korea"

 Commemorative Order "Anniversary of the Foundation of the People's Army"

 Order of Military Service Honour First Class

 Commemorative Order "30th Anniversary of the Agricultural Presentation"

 Order of the National Flag Second Class, twice

 Order of Freedom and Independence Second Class, twice

 Order of the Red Banner of Three Great Revolutions

 Order of the National Flag Third Class, twice

 Commemorative Medal "Fatherland Liberation"

 Commemorative Medal "The Foundation of the People's Republic of Korea"

 Medal For Military Merit, twice

 Commemorative Medal "Military Parade"

References

Living people
Government ministers of North Korea
Law enforcement in North Korea
1944 births
Members of the Supreme People's Assembly
Alternate members of the 6th Politburo of the Workers' Party of Korea
Members of the 6th Central Committee of the Workers' Party of Korea
Members of the 7th Central Committee of the Workers' Party of Korea
People from North Hamgyong
People from Hoeryong